Caterina "Cat" Torres (born 14 January 1991) is a Melbourne-based singer-songwriter. At the age of 18, Torres signed a record deal with Sony/RCA in Britain. In 2013, Torres was a contestant on The Voice. Her coach, Ricky Martin invited her to be a special guest on his national tour, performing in arenas around the country. Torres later signed to Mercury Records Australia which is part of Universal Music Australia.

Career

The Voice Australia

Performances

Discography

Singles

References 

Living people
1991 births
21st-century Australian singers
21st-century Australian women singers